Muffett is a surname. Notable people with the surname include:

 Alec Muffett (born 1968), Anglo-American software engineer
 Billy Muffett (1930-2008), American baseball player

See also
 Little Miss Muffet, a nursery rhyme
 Thomas Muffet (1553-1604), English naturalist and physician